Widnes Wild
are an English ice hockey team from the town of Widnes who play at Planet Ice Ice Rink in Widnes. They were formed in 2013. They currently compete in the Moralee Conference of the English Ice Hockey Association National Ice Hockey League (North).

The current club chairman is Paralympian Matt Lloyd.

The club has a youth system which starts at Under-9's, as well as a women's team competing in the Women's Premier League.

With the support of the local community the Widnes Wild run a vibrant schools programme to introduce children to ice hockey.

In the 15/16 season the Wild finished second in the league to Deeside Dragons.  In the final league game of the season the Wild forfeited the games against the Deeside Dragons citing safety fears, after Wild player Lee Kemp suffered a head injury following an altercation with Dragons' Alex Roberts.

The Wild finished the 16/17 season second in the league to the Blackburn Eagles, missing out on promotion after a dramatic overtime loss to the Deeside Dragons; however, the Wild went on to win their first piece of silverware by winning the 16/17 D2N Playoffs.

In September 2017 it was announced that Ollie Barron had won the first English National Ice Hockey League D2N Player of the Month award.

In the summer of 2018 it was announced that the Wild would be sponsored by YKK.

The Wild also won the NIHL Laidler Playoffs in the 2017/18 season and 2018/19 season to complete a trio of playoff championship titles as well as being crowned league champions for the first time in the 2018/19 season.  At the end of the 2018/19 season it was announced that Ollie Baron would step down as player/coach to focus on his life outside of hockey and Mike Clancy was appointed as the new head coach.

League history

{|class="wikitable" style="font-size: 95%; "
! Season
! Position
! Wins
! Draws
! Losses
!±
|-
|2013-14
|5
|11
|1
|16
| -50
|- -50
|-
|2014-15
|4
|20
|2
|14
|37
|-
|2015-16
|2
|19
|3
|6
|86
|-
|2016-17
|2
|20
|4
|4
|59
|-
|2017-18
|2
|23
|
|9
|82
|-
|2018-19
|1
|28
|
|4
|140
|-
|2019-20
|4
|15
|
|7
|51
|}

Club roster 2022-23
(*) Denotes a Non-British Trained player (Import)

2021/22 Outgoing

References

Ice hockey teams in England
Sport in Widnes